Pollock is a small town in Grant Parish, Louisiana, United States. It is part of the Alexandria, Louisiana Metropolitan Statistical Area. The population was 469 as of the 2010 census, up from 376 in 2000. Pollock and southern Grant Parish have been experiencing residential and business growth in recent years. The population of Pollock increased between the 2000 and 2010 censuses as a result of the annexation of the land surrounding a federal prison, the United States Penitentiary, Pollock.

History
The town proper that sprang up in 1892 around a sawmill was named in honor of the manager of the Big Creek Sawmill and Lumber Company, Captain James W. Pollock.

Pollock was for many years a sundown town, a community that did not allow black people to be there after sundown. Historian Herbert Aptheker reported a sign "Niggers stay out of Pollock" at the town's boundary during World War II when he commanded a group of black soldiers nearby. The town's official history notes "the few individuals of African descent" living in the Pollock area left soon after the Colfax massacre. The Louisiana Almanac reported that as late as 1990, Pollock still had no black residents.

Geography
U.S. Route 165 is the main highway through the town, leading north  to Georgetown and south 16 miles to Alexandria.

Pollock is within Kisatchie National Forest.

Demographics

As of the census of 2000, there were 376 people, 157 households, and 108 families residing in the town. The racial makeup of the town was 97.87% White, 0.27% Native American, 0.53% Asian, and 1.33% from two or more races. Hispanic or Latino of any race were 1.86% of the population.

There were 157 households, out of which 36.9% had children under the age of 18 living with them, 48.4% were married couples living together, 18.5% had a female householder with no husband present, and 30.6% were non-families. 30.6% of all households were made up of individuals, and 15.9% had someone living alone who was 65 years of age or older. The average household size was 2.39 and the average family size was 2.98.

In the town, the population was spread out, with 28.5% under the age of 18, 7.7% from 18 to 24, 25.5% from 25 to 44, 22.6% from 45 to 64, and 15.7% who were 65 years of age or older. The median age was 38 years.  For every 100 females, there were 91.8 males. For every 100 females age 18 and over, there were 83.0 males.

The median income for a household in the town was $25,625, and the median income for a family was $29,063. Males had a median income of $21,250 versus $28,125 for females. The per capita income for the town was $12,134. About 20.5% of families and 22.9% of the population were below the poverty line, including 33.3% of those under age 18 and 14.5% of those age 65 or over.

Government and infrastructure
The Federal Bureau of Prisons United States Penitentiary, Pollock is located near Pollock.

Education
Pollock residents are zoned to Grant Parish School Board schools.

Notable people
 Henry E. Hardtner, timber magnate and Louisiana legislator, was with his brother, Quintin Hardtner, benefactor of the Episcopal Camp Hardtner and Conference Center near Pollock.
 Swords Lee, timber owner from Pollock and Alexandria; former Grant Parish assessor and state representative
 Charlton Lyons, pioneer of the modern Republican Party in Louisiana, was the principal of Pollock High School from 1917 to 1918.
 Russ Springer, pitcher for 10 Major League baseball teams spanning 18 seasons from 1992 until 2010
 Ed Tarpley, district attorney for Grant Parish from 1991 to 1997; reared in Pollock; practices law in Alexandria

References

External links
Town of Pollock official website

Towns in Louisiana
Towns in Grant Parish, Louisiana
Alexandria metropolitan area, Louisiana
Sundown towns in the United States